The following is a list of awards and nominations received by Billy Bob Thornton.

Awards and nominations

Academy Awards

American Film Institute Awards

Berlin International Film Festival Awards

Blockbuster Entertainment Awards

Boston Society of Film Critics Awards

Central Ohio Film Critics Association Awards

Chicago Film Critics Association Awards

Chicago International Film Festival Awards

Cinequest Film Festival Awards

Crime Thriller Awards

Critics' Choice Awards

Dallas–Fort Worth Film Critics Association Awards

DVD Exclusive Awards

Edgar Awards

Emmy Awards

Empire Awards

Fantasporto Awards

Florida Film Critics Circle Awards

Golden Globe Awards

Hollywood Walk of Fame Awards

Humanitas Prizes

Independent Spirit Awards

Kansas City Film Critics Circle Awards

Las Vegas Film Critics Society Awards

London Film Critics' Circle Awards

Los Angeles Film Critics Association Awards

National Society of Film Critics Awards

Online Film & Television Association Awards

Online Film Critics Society Awards

Paris Film Festival Awards

Phoenix Film Critics Society Awards

Russian Guild of Film Critics Awards

San Diego Film Critics Society Awards

Satellite Awards

Saturn Awards

Screen Actors Guild Awards

Southeastern Film Critics Association Awards

Teen Choice Awards

Washington D.C. Area Film Critics Association Awards

Writers Guild of America Awards

See also

 Billy Bob Thornton filmography
 Billy Bob Thornton discography

Notes
 A  Tied with William H. Macy for his roles of George Parker/James Gordon/Arbogast in Pleasantville/A Civil Action/Psycho.
 B  The other honorees included Richard Leacock, Spike Lee, and Ron Shelton.
 C  Shared with Joel Coen and Ethan Coen.
 D  Shared with Marc Juris and Jessica Falcon for episode "Film Preservation Classics with Billy Bob Thornton".
 E  Shared with Tom Epperson.
 F  Shared with producers David L. Bushell and Brandon Rosser.
 G  Tied with Bill Murray for his roles of Herman Blume and Kenneth Bowden in Rushmore and Wild Things (also known as Sex Crimes).
 H  Shared with Lucas Black, Natalie Canerday, Robert Duvall, James Hampton, John Ritter, J. T. Walsh, and Dwight Yoakam.
 I  Shared with the cast.

External links

 
 
 

Thornton, Billy Bob